Riverside Secondary School is a public coeducational secondary school located in Port Coquitlam, British Columbia, Canada. It enrolls approximately 1470 students from grades 9 to 12.

General information
Riverside lies on the south side of Port Coquitlam, the location of which was formerly grassland. Established in 1996, the school colours are forest green, teal blue, white, and black. Its mascots are called the Rapid & Wave, and its logo was designed in 1996. The school has five portables as of 2002 to the present date.

Riverside offers French immersion, allowing students to receive an additional Dogwood BC high school diploma in French Immersion. Students are also given the opportunity to complete an examination for the Diplôme d'Études en Langue Française.

Riverside also offers honours-version courses in English 9–12, mathematics 9–12, and science 9–10. There is also a science co-op class offered to students in Grade 11.

In addition, Riverside offers a variety of clubs, sports teams, and volunteering opportunities to their students, which participate in many provincial and community events. Riverside also offers theatrical performances every year which have garnered awards both regionally and provincially for over the past decade..

In 2013, Riverside embarked on its 1:1 (one to one) initiative, asking every grade 9 student to bring a tablet or laptop to use at school for his or her learning.  This BYOD program, plus the emphasis on students building a digital portfolio, is part of Riverside's goal to develop digital citizens prepared for the 21st Century.

The Eddy
Riverside's newspaper is The Eddy. In 2013, the newspaper began to publish their content online and stopped printing physical papers. As part of Riverside's 1:1 initiative, an online newscast (The EddyCast) was launched. After 2 years, the EddyCast was renamed and relaunched as Rapid Fire.

Until 2019/2020, the Eddy was primarily run through the Journalism 10, 11, and 12 classes. However, due to changes in the BC Curriculum, the Eddy primarily takes contributions from students in New Media 10 and 11.

Notable alumni

References

External links
Riverside Secondary

High schools in British Columbia
Educational institutions established in 1996
Port Coquitlam
1996 establishments in British Columbia